Innovacorp is a Nova Scotia crown corporation managing an early-stage venture capital fund. The organization was established under Nova Scotia’s Innovation Corporation Act, 1994–95, c. 5, s. 1. Its goal is to help early stage Nova Scotia companies commercialize their technologies for export markets. Key industries include information technology, life sciences, clean technology, advanced manufacturing and aerospace.

In May 2010, the organization’s High Performance Incubation (HPi) earned an international award for its work from the National Business Incubation Association.

Innovacorp established a yearly technology start-up competition (I3) with $100,000 dollar winning prize. Notable winners include Tether and Xona Games.

History
Innovacorp, established by a provincial statute, superseded the Nova Scotia Research Foundation Corporation, which was established in 1946 as the Research Foundation of Nova Scotia.

Investments
Innovacorp investments include  companies such as SimplyCast, CarbonCure, GoInstant, SabrTech, Equals6, AioTV, LiveLenz, TruLeaf, DeNovaMed, Airline Employee Travel Inc (GoBumpFree), Proposify and TitanFile.

Beginning in 2015, Innovacorp invested around C$3 million in Meta Materials Inc., a Dartmouth-based developer of "high-performance functional materials and nanocomposites" that was founded in 2013. In 2021, shortly after Meta Materials was listed on the Nasdaq stock exchange, Innovacorp sold its shares, resulting in a $104-million return on investment.

References

External links
 

1995 establishments in Nova Scotia
Crown corporations of Nova Scotia
Organizations established in 1994
Companies based in Halifax, Nova Scotia